Dzyanis Zhukaw (born 27 October 1987) is a retired Belarusian professional footballer.

External links
Profile at teams.by

1987 births
Living people
Belarusian footballers
FC Vitebsk players
FC Polotsk players
Association football midfielders